The EABA Championship is an international basketball tournament which takes place every two years between national men's teams from East Asia. The tournament is also known as the East Asian Basketball Championship.

The tournament is organised by the East Asia Basketball Association, a subzone of the FIBA Asia. It serves as the East Asian qualifying tournament for the FIBA Asia Cup (formerly FIBA Asia Championship).

Summary

See also 
 2009 FIBA Asia Championship qualification
 2011 FIBA Asia Championship qualification
 2013 FIBA Asia Championship qualification
 2017 FIBA Asia Cup qualification

External links 
 FIBA Asia official website

 
Basketball competitions in Asia between national teams
2009 establishments in Asia